Benny Bonanno is a former member of the Cleveland, Ohio City Council, Ohio House of Representatives, and Cuyahoga County Clerk of Courts.

He unsuccessfully ran for Mayor of Cleveland in 1989.

References

External links
Bill Mason's Mean Machine
The Guy Next Door

Democratic Party members of the Ohio House of Representatives
Living people
Year of birth missing (living people)